Vittorio Sindoni (born 21 April 1939) is an Italian director and screenwriter.

Life and career 
Born in Capo d'Orlando, Sicily, Sindoni started his career on stage directing the theater group "Il Collettivo" ("The Collective") in Rome, and worked for some years as author of several RAI cultural programs. In the late 1960s he entered the film industry as director and screenwriter, directing numerous comedies. He is known to Italian giallo fans for his 1968 film Deadly Inheritance. For his film Gli anni struggenti he won the Mario Gromo Plate at the 1979 Grolle d'oro Awards. Since the 1980s he devoted himself to television.

Selected filmography 
 Deadly Inheritance (1969)
 Per amore di Cesarina (1975) 
 Perdutamente tuo... mi firmo Macaluso Carmelo fu Giuseppe (1976) 
 Positano (1996, TV)
 Non lasciamoci più (1999-2001, TV)
 Butta la luna (2006-2009, TV)

References

External links 
 

1939 births
20th-century Italian people
Italian film directors
Italian screenwriters
Italian male screenwriters
Film people from the Province of Messina
Living people